Enteromius ensis is a species of ray-finned fish in the genus Enteromius  which occurs only in Angola.

Footnotes 

 

ensis
Cyprinid fish of Africa
Fish of Angola
Endemic fauna of Angola
Taxa named by George Albert Boulenger
Fish described in 1910